Lim Say Hup (1935-2005), was a male badminton player from Malaysia.

Career
Say Hup won the All England Open Badminton Championships, considered as the unofficial World Badminton Championships, in men's doubles with Teh Kew San in 1959.

He featured in the final of the 1958 Thomas Cup in addition to representing Malaysia in the Thomas Cup during 1961 and 1964.

Say Hup also won the Glasgow World Invitational, All-Canadian Championships, All-American Championships and Malaysian Open before retiring in 1964.

Personal life
The same year that he won the All England Championships (1959) he received a BA with honours in history from University of Malaya in 1959. He worked for the Commerce and Industry Ministry, Esso and the Asian Development Bank in Manila.

Death
Say Hup died in 2005 at his residence in Manila, Philippines. He was 70 years old.

Achievements

Asian Championships 
Men's doubles

Mixed doubles

International tournaments 
Men's doubles

Mixed doubles

Invitational Tournaments 
Men's doubles

References 

Malaysian male badminton players
1935 births
2005 deaths
Malaysian sportspeople of Chinese descent